The Niles Car and Manufacturing Company was an American manufacturer of railroad equipment, including many streetcar and interurban cars. It was founded in 1901 in Niles, Ohio and published catalogs showcasing their various cars. 

Niles specialized in building wooden-bodied cars in the heyday of interurban building. Its cars had a reputation of being well-built and stylish; Niles advertising called them "The Electric Pullmans."

The company also produced equipment for the trucking industry, an industry reference citing 2 models of 1 and 2 tons respectively, costing $1500 to $2400, utilizing a worm drive and custom bodies to suit.

The company ceased producing railroad cars in 1917.  The plant and equipment were purchased by the Engel Aircraft Company to produce aircraft parts for the United States Army Signal Corps.

Customers 
Niles' clients included the:

 Aurora Elgin and Chicago Railroad (later the Chicago Aurora and Elgin Railroad); including the oldest operating interurban in the US (#20)
 Bamberger Electric Railroad
 Fort Dodge, Des Moines and Southern Railway
 Northern Electric Railway (later part of the Sacramento Northern Railway)
 The Milwaukee Electric Railway and Light Company
 Northern Ohio Traction & Light
 Pacific Northwest Traction Company
 Rochester, Lockport and Buffalo Railroad
 Rock Island Southern Railway
 San Francisco, Napa and Calistoga Railway
 St. Paul Southern Electric Railway
 The Chicago Lake Shore and South Bend Railway
 Toledo, Port Clinton and Lakeside Railway
 Toronto Civic Railways (DE DT M - late TTC Class H, H1 and H3 cars).
 Washington, Baltimore and Annapolis Electric Railway
 Yakima Valley Transportation Company
 Youngstown and Ohio River Railroad

References

External links

Defunct rolling stock manufacturers of the United States
Niles, Ohio
Manufacturing companies established in 1901
Manufacturing companies disestablished in 1917
Defunct manufacturing companies based in Ohio
Electric vehicle manufacturers of the United States
Tram manufacturers